Bolani (Dari: بولانی), also called Periki (Pashto: پارکی) is a stuffed flat-bread from Afghanistan, fried with a filling. It has a thin crust and can be stuffed with a variety of ingredients, such as potatoes or leeks but also grated pumpkin, chives, red lentils or with minced meat. It can be served with plain yogurt or mint yogurt and is usually served with a doogh drink.

Bolani is made for special occasions like birthday parties, engagement parties or holidays. It is widely sold on the streets in Afghanistan, particularly in cities such as Kabul, Jalalabad and Kandahar.

Variations

Egg-roll wrapper method
The method of using eggroll wrappers instead of making the dough for the bolani is a time saving convenience often used in Western countries.  The edges of the eggroll wrappers are lightly brushed with  water to allow for sticking.  The wrappers are then filled half way either diagonally or lengthwise with the preferred filling.  Each side is then fried until golden brown.  This method is the easiest and fastest way of preparing bolani.

Baked dough method
Another popular method for making  Bolani is baking them. Although frying is the most popular method for special occasions, baking is becoming very popular amongst the western crowd. While Bolani was originally baked to cut back on fat, it is now becoming popular due to the unique flavor it imparts. Baking allows for a thicker crust that leads to a fluffy pastry filled with toppings.
Some argue that baked Bolani is not traditional due to its thick nature and meat stuffed variations. Regardless, it remains as one of the most popular methods of preparing Bolani in America.

Gallery

See also
 Gözleme
 Qistibi
 Qutab

References 

Flatbreads
Vegetarian cuisine
Afghan cuisine
Hazaragi cuisine
Pashtun cuisine
Indo-Caribbean cuisine
Stuffed dishes